The former Newton County Jail is located at the junction of Spring and Elm Streets in Jasper, Arkansas.  Built of local stone c. 1903–04, it served as a local lockup until 2009, when a new jail was opened.  It is a two-story structure, located just off the courthouse square northwest of the county courthouse.  Its main facade has a center entrance flanked by barred windows, and a larger two-leaf casement window, also barred, set in a segmented-arch opening, at the center of the second floor.

The building was listed on the National Register of Historic Places in 1994.

See also
National Register of Historic Places listings in Newton County, Arkansas

References

Jails on the National Register of Historic Places in Arkansas
Italianate architecture in Arkansas
Government buildings completed in 1904
National Register of Historic Places in Newton County, Arkansas
1904 establishments in Arkansas